Allan Michael Green (born 28 May 1960 in Pulborough) is an English former cricketer active from 1980 to 1989 who played for Sussex. He appeared in 164 first-class matches as a righthanded batsman who bowled off breaks. He scored 7,932 runs with a highest score of 179 among nine centuries and took 49 wickets with a best performance of six for 82.

Notes

1960 births
English cricketers
Sussex cricketers
Free State cricketers
Living people